Krzysztof Ryszard Sikora (born 16 May 1959 in Chełm) is a Polish politician. He was elected to Sejm on 25 September 2005 getting 5695 votes in 20 Warsaw district, candidating from Samoobrona Rzeczpospolitej Polskiej list.

See also
Members of Polish Sejm 2005-2007

External links
Krzysztof Sikora - parliamentary page - includes declarations of interest, voting record, and transcripts of speeches.

1959 births
Living people
People from Chełm
Members of the Polish Sejm 2005–2007
Self-Defence of the Republic of Poland politicians